Galimzyan Salikhovich Khusainov (27 June 1937 – 5 February 2010) was a Soviet football player of Tatar ethnicity who played as a forward.

International career 
He played for the Soviet Union national team (33 matches/4 goals), and was a participant at the 1962 FIFA World Cup, 1966 FIFA World Cup and at the 1964 European Nations' Cup, where the Soviet Union squad won the silver medal, despite his goal in the final.

Honours 
 Soviet Top League winner: 1962, 1969.
 Soviet Cup winner: 1963, 1965, 1971.
 1964 European Nations' Cup runner-up.
 Grigory Fedotov club member.

References 

  RussiaTeam biography
 FIFA Profile

1937 births
2010 deaths
People from Tatarstan
Tatar people of Russia
Tatar sportspeople
Communist Party of the Soviet Union members
PFC Krylia Sovetov Samara players
FC Spartak Moscow players
Russian footballers
Soviet Top League players
Soviet footballers
Soviet football managers
1962 FIFA World Cup players
1964 European Nations' Cup players
1966 FIFA World Cup players
Soviet Union international footballers
Higher School of Coaches alumni
Association football forwards